Oussama Marnaoui (born 16 June 1999) is a Tunisian professional basketball player for US Monastir and the Tunisian national team.

Marnaoui started his professional career with JS Kairouan, where he played one season before signing with US Monastir.

He represented Tunisia at the FIBA AfroBasket 2021, where the team won the gold medal.

BAL career statistics

|-
|style="text-align:left;"|2021
|style="text-align:left;"|Monastir
| 4 || 0 || 5.9 || .455 || .333 || .769 || 1.0 || .0 || .5 || .3 || 5.3
|- class="sortbottom"
| style="text-align:center;" colspan="2"|Career
| 4 || 0 || 5.9 || .455 || .333 || .769 || 1.0 || .0 || .5 || .3 || 5.3

References

External links

1999 births
Living people
Guards (basketball)
People from Kairouan
Tunisian expatriate sportspeople in the United States
Tunisian men's basketball players
US Monastir basketball players
JS Kairouan basketball players